Sauqoit may refer to:

 Sauquoit, New York, a hamlet
 Sauquoit Creek, a river in Oneida County, New York
 Sauquoit Valley, a valley in Oneida County, New York